Elizabeth Christina Mary Durack (born 20 May 1994) is a former professional footballer who last played as a goalkeeper for Chelsea of the FA Women's Super League.

Early life
Durack was born in Australia, to an English mother. She was the only girl on her school's team.

College career
In 2013, Durack took up a place at Harvard University to study human development regenerative biology and play for the Harvard Crimson soccer team.

Club career

Western Sydney Wanderers
Durack played alongside Chloe Logarzo for five years at the North West Sydney Koalas, and played on an Australian under-19 schoolgirl team which toured Britain and Ireland in 2012. In the 2012–13 W-League season, Durack played for expansion team Western Sydney Wanderers. She was back-up goalkeeper to Þóra Björg Helgadóttir.

Everton
When Durack travelled to England to train with the England women's national under-19 football team in early 2013, the Football Association found her a place at Everton, where she understudied experienced but injury-prone veteran Rachel Brown.

Notts County
In June 2016 Durack joined Notts County. The Lady Pies were in the market for a goalkeeper after their first choice Carly Telford suffered torn ankle ligaments a few days previously. A month later, she was deemed ineligible due to NCAA rules.

Return to Everton
After graduating from Harvard Durack re-signed for Everton in July 2017.

Chelsea
On 8 June 2018, Durack signed for Chelsea. She announced her retirement from professional football in 2019.

International career
Durack attended the New South Wales Institute of Sport and was a member of the Australia women's national under-17 soccer team, before the coach rejected her as not good enough for international level.

Later the English Football Association e-mailed Harvard University asking for details of any players who were eligible for their women's national teams. As Durack's mother was born and raised in Doncaster, her name was put forward and she was invited to try out for the England women's national under-19 football team.

She was named as one of ten "emerging talents" by UEFA after helping England reach the final of the 2013 UEFA Women's Under-19 Championship. At the 2014 Cyprus Cup, England's senior national team coach Mark Sampson gave Durack her first cap in a six-minute substitute appearance in a 3–0 win over Finland.

Later that year she played in all three of England under-20's matches at the 2014 FIFA U-20 Women's World Cup in Canada. In June 2016, Durack played for the England women's national under-23 football team against the United States.

Retirement and later life
Durack retired in September 2019 to work at Goldman Sachs.

References

External links
 
 
 Lizzie Durack profile at Harvard Crimson
 

1994 births
England women's international footballers
English women's footballers
England women's under-23 international footballers
Australian women's soccer players
Living people
Harvard Crimson women's soccer players
Soccer players from Sydney
English people of Australian descent
Everton F.C. (women) players
Chelsea F.C. Women players
Women's Super League players
Expatriate women's soccer players in the United States
Western Sydney Wanderers FC (A-League Women) players
A-League Women players
Australian people of English descent
Women's association football goalkeepers
Australian expatriate sportspeople in England